The 1996 UK Championship was a professional ranking snooker tournament that took place at the Guild Hall in Preston, England. The event started on 15 November 1996 and the televised stages were shown on BBC between 23 November and 1 December 1996.

Stephen Hendry won his third UK Championship in a row and fifth overall by defeating John Higgins 10–9 in the final. Hendry led 8–4, fell behind 8–9 after Higgins won 5 frames in a row, and then breaks of 82 and 77 in the last two frames was enough for Hendry to get the victory. Ken Doherty made the highest break of the tournament with 141.

Tony Drago made the fastest century break in a ranking event with a time of 3 minutes 31 seconds.

Prize fund
The breakdown of prize money for this year is shown below:
Winner   £70,000
Runner-up £37,000
Highest break  £5,000

Main draw

1st Round (round of 64) Best of 17 frames

 Stephen Hendry   9–6  Dominic Dale 

 Robert Milkins  9–3   Neal Foulds 

 David Gray   9–6   Dave Harold 

 Anthony Hamilton   9–3   Quinten Hann 

 James Wattana   9–3   Jon Birch 

 Paul Hunter   9–0   Willie Thorne 

 Terry Murphy   9–7   Ronnie O'Sullivan 

 Mick Price   9–6   Eddie Manning 

 Alan McManus   9–6   Ian Sargeant 

 Gary Wilkinson   9–2   Brian Morgan 

 Billy Snaddon   9–6   Darren Morgan 

 Rod Lawler   9–5   Darren Clarke 

 Tai Pichit   9–7   Jimmy White 

 Joe Johnson   9–8   Dene O'Kane 

 John Parrott   9–4   Noppadon Noppachorn 

 Martin Clark   9–6   Tony Jones 

 Karl Broughton   9–8   Peter Ebdon 

 Chris Small   9–4   David Roe 

 Alain Robidoux   9–7   Jason Weston 

 Stephen Lee   9–3   Jason Prince 

 Steve Davis   9–5   Jamie Burnett 

 Shokat Ali   9–4   Jason Ferguson 

 Ken Doherty   9–2   Nick Pearce 

 Dennis Taylor   9–5   Peter Lines 

 Nigel Bond   9–0   Paul Wykes 

 Joe Swail   9–8   Mark King 

 Mark Williams   9–3   Tony Chappel 

 Yasin Merchant   9–5   Dave Finbow 

 Tony Drago   9–4   Alan Burnett 

 Andy Hicks   9–4   Nick Terry 

 John Higgins   9–8  Steve Newbury 

 Marcus Campbell   9–6   Steve James 

2nd Round (round of 32) Best of 17 frames

 Stephen Hendry   9–5   Robert Milkins 

 Anthony Hamilton   9–8   David Gray 

 Paul Hunter   9–5   James Wattana 

 Terry Murphy   9–6   Mick Price 

 Alan McManus   9–7   Gary Wilkinson 

 Billy Snaddon   9–7   Rod Lawler 

 Joe Johnson   9–6   Tai Pichit 

 John Parrott   9–8   Martin Clark 

 Karl Broughton   9–6   Chris Small 

 Alain Robidoux   9–6   Stephen Lee 

 Steve Davis   9–7   Shokat Ali 

 Ken Doherty   9–4   Dennis Taylor 

 Nigel Bond   9–6   Joe Swail 

 Mark Williams   9–3   Yasin Merchant 

 Tony Drago   9–5   Andy Hicks 

 John Higgins   9–5   Marcus Campbell

Final

Century breaks

 141, 140  Ken Doherty
 141, 133, 122, 106, 106, 104  Andy Hicks
 140, 115, 108, 108, 104, 103, 102  Stephen Hendry
 138  Darren Clarke
 136, 118, 105, 100, 100  Paul Hunter
 135, 132, 109  James Wattana
 135, 109  John Higgins
 135, 106  Jason Weston
 132, 113  Nigel Bond
 131  Shokat Ali
 130  Tony Chappel
 130  Steve Newbury
 124, 119, 106, 104  Mark Williams
 122, 103  Tony Drago
 122, 102  Marcus Campbell
 116  Karl Broughton
 115  Tai Pichit
 111, 100  Anthony Hamilton
 110  Peter Ebdon
 110  Ronnie O'Sullivan
 109, 107  David Gray
 109, 101  John Parrott
 109  Stephen Lee
 108  Jonathan Birch
 105  Joe Johnson
 104  Gary Wilkinson
 102, 102, 100  Terry Murphy
 102  Tony Jones
 102  Billy Snaddon
 101  Quinten Hann

References

UK Championship (snooker)
UK Championship
UK Championship
UK Championship
UK Championship